is the fourth studio album by Japanese entertainer Miho Nakayama. Released through King Records on December 18, 1986, the album features the single "Waku Waku Sasete". It is a concept album themed around exotic world travel. The songs in Exotique were solely written by Takashi Matsumoto and Kyōhei Tsutsumi and arranged by Motoki Funayama.

The album peaked at No. 6 on Oricon's albums chart and sold over 206,000 copies.

Track listing 
All lyrics are written by Takashi Matsumoto; all music is composed by Kyōhei Tsutsumi; all music is arranged by Motoki Funayama.

Charts
Weekly charts

Year-end charts

References

External links
 
 
 

1986 albums
Miho Nakayama albums
Japanese-language albums
Concept albums
King Records (Japan) albums